Actizera atrigemmata is a butterfly in the family Lycaenidae. It is found on Madagascar. The habitat consists of transformed grassland.

References

Butterflies described in 1878
Polyommatini
Butterflies of Africa
Taxa named by Arthur Gardiner Butler